"Back & Forth" is the debut single performed by American singer Aaliyah for her debut studio album, Age Ain't Nothing but a Number (1994). The song was written and produced by R&B singer R. Kelly, and lyrically the song is about a teenager's excitement for partying on the weekend with friends. "Back and Forth" has been described as being a dance/pop/R&B and new jack swing song. Aaliyah sings in a "laid back" style. Blackground and Jive released the song as the album's lead single on April 8, 1994, to generally positive reviews with many critics praising the song's lyrical content and Aaliyah's vocal delivery on the record.

Commercially "Back & Forth" performed well peaking at number five on the US Billboard Hot 100 on the week ending on July 2, 1994. The song was just as successful on the Hot R&B/Hip-Hop Songs chart where it topped the charts on the week ending on May 21, 1994, eventually spending a total of 3 weeks at number one on the chart. The song also topped the Rhythmic top 40 charts on the week ending on July 9, 1994. On June 9, 1994, the song was certified gold by the Recording Industry Association of America (RIAA). Towards the end of 1994 Billboard reported that the song had sold over 700,000 copies.

Internationally "Back & Forth" performed moderately well peaking within the top 20 at number 16 on the UK's official chart. Also in the UK the song peaked within the top 20 at number 16 on the Official Dance Chart. Elsewhere in Europe the song peaked within the top 40 at number 38 in the Netherlands. The song's accompanying music video was directed by Millicent Shelton in Aaliyah's hometown of Detroit. The actual video location was at Aaliyah's high school and on the day of the video shoot many local teens were recruited to be in multiple scenes of the video.

Music and lyrics
"Back & Forth" has been described as being a dance, pop and R&B song. Quinn Peterson from Jet labeled the song as new jack swing-oriented.  On the song, Aaliyah sings with a "subtle, laid-back vocal" while she talks about partying with her friends during the weekend. According to Billboard, "It doesn't matter that Aaliyah is 15. It's the freakin' weekend, baby, so she's picking up her ladies—presumably in her jeep—and hitting the local party spot".

When asked about the lyrical direction of the song, Aaliyah stated: "It's not a song about love or whatever; it's about going to a party and having fun. I have songs about love, crushes, or whatever, but that song is about dancing. This album is about teens and what they go through." Entertainment Weekly described the song as a "steamy invitation to dance all night" with Aaliyah requesting to "let the funky melody put you in the mood".

Critical reception
"Back & Forth" received widespread critical acclaim upon its release. Larry Flick from Billboard felt that it was on the course to being a pop and urban smash and praised Aaliyah's vocal styling: "It is worth noting that this newcomer has the vocal charm and range to warm the hearts of punters on her own". According to Georgette Cline from The Boombox, "Moving away from the R&B that speaks of heartbreak and betrayal, Aaliyah's vocals shined on the lead single from her debut LP, 'Age Ain't Nothing But a Number,' as she sang of hitting the dancefloor and getting lost in the DJ's tunes". Elena Bergeron from Complex felt that the song was the perfect example of why Aaliyah could play coy with the media regarding her age. Bergeron also praised Aaliyah's voice: "Instead of over-emoting like a child singer, Aaliyah's confident in singing about something basic—it's just a song about partying on a Friday night-and that takes an adult's restraint". Bill Speed and John Martinucci from the Gavin Report noted: "Don't sleep on this track, Aaliyah's mid-tempo melodic groove will grab you and won't let go."

Alan Jones from Music Week deemed it "a smooth, summery, soulful jill swing debut", noting "an easy, rolling, almost jazzy style, and a vocal that is not a million miles from Janet Jackson." Ralph Tee from the magazine's RM Dance Update said "this young lady pitches her voice somewhere between Mary J. Blige and the lead singer of SWV on a medium-paced swing tune, the melody being in one of those sultry minor keys so typical of contemporary urban R&B". James Hamilton called it a "seductively cooing girl's R. Kelly created superb slinky bump n' (groin) grinder". Quentin B. Huff from PopMatters felt that the song was "Simple, but effective, and Aaliyah's layered vocals warm the track like a soothing blanket. "Back & Forth" integrates seamlessly into any up-tempo dance playlist". James Hunter from Vibe felt the song was a "leading candidate for the years best single" and that Aaliyah had "one of those "Who's that?" voices". In a review for Age Ain't Nothing but a Number, Tonya Pendleton from The Washington Post praised Aaliyah's vocals on the song by saying: "Aaliyah's silken voice caresses the beat, which swings rhythmically through "Back and Forth," one of this summer's street anthems".

Commercial performance
After its release on April 8, "Back & Forth" debuted at number 56 on the US Billboard Hot 100 during the week of April 30, 1994. By May 14, the song had sold 31,000 units according to Nielsen SoundScan. The song reached its peak at number five almost three months after it was released, on July 2. On the Hot R&B/Hip-Hop Songs chart, it debuted at number 13, and peaked at number one on May 21. During its chart run, "Back & Forth" ended R. Kelly's 12-week run atop the Hot R&B/Hip-Hop Songs with "Bump n' Grind". Additionally, "Back & Forth" peaked atop the Rhythmic chart on July 9. Meanwhile, it peaked at number 16 on the Mainstream Top 40 on July 30. On June 9, it was certified gold by the Recording Industry Association of America (RIAA). By the end of 1994, the single had sold over 700,000 copies in the United States, being the 13th best-selling single of the year. Outside Billboard charts, the song reached number four on Los Angeles Times Southern California pop singles chart on June 26, 1994.

Internationally, "Back & Forth" experienced moderate success. In the United Kingdom, the single was released on June 20, 1994. It reached number 16 on the UK Singles Chart six days later and stayed in the top 100 for five weeks. On July 10, the song peaked at number 16 on the UK Dance Singles Chart. According to the Official Charts Company (OCC), "Back & Forth" is Aaliyah's fifth best-selling song in the UK. In the Netherlands, the song peaked at number 38 on the Dutch Single Top 100. In New Zealand, it peaked at number 48. However, the song achieved success in Japan, where it reached number ten.

Music video

Background and production
The music video for "Back & Forth" was directed by Millicent Shelton and it was filmed on January 16, 1994, which was Aaliyah's 15th birthday and released in February 1994. The video was filmed at Detroit's High School for the Fine and Performing Arts which was the school that Aaliyah attended. Prior to filming the video both Aaliyah and R.Kelly worked on dance moves and the styling for the video. On the day of the video many local teens were recruited to be in multiple scenes of the video. When Aaliyah discussed her experience shooting her first music video she said "That was my first video, but Millicent made me comfortable Between takes, she listened to the music of Tupac, Wu-Tang, and Gang Starr, They all rap on an intellectual level”.

Synopsis
The video opens with a male entering a (school) gym, bouncing a basketball. When the song kicks in, there are cuts of people entering the gym and people playing basketball. Aaliyah enters wearing baggy clothing, a bandana and shades. She sings the song by the gym's entrance. In other parts of the clip she is seen dancing in the middle of the gymnasium with a crowd moving around her, sitting with R. Kelly in the bleachers and performing on a stage to her fans. The original setting was chosen for the music video in Los Angeles, but was relocated to her hometown of Detroit because of an earthquake.

Reception
The instant success for Back & Forth's accompanying music video prompted Aaliyah's record label to release her debut album earlier than expected. According to Barry Weiss, Senior Vice President of Jive records, "The Original June 14 release date of the album "Age Ain't Nothing But A Number" was moved up to May 24. Weiss continued his statement saying,"Back & Forth" has permeated the consciousness of the young public, and because it has picked up steam so quickly, MTV jumped on board faster than we thought, which led to our decision to drop the album sooner". During its chart run the music video for "Back & Forth" received heavy TV airplay. For the week ending on June 12, 1994, the music video was the second most played video on BET. Meanwhile, for the week ending on June 26, 1994, the music video was the twelfth most played video on MTV.

Legacy

Madonna sampled "Back & Forth" on her song "Inside of Me" from her sixth studio album Bedtime Stories (1994), which was released a few months after "Back & Forth".

 In October 1994 the song was nominated for Best New R&B/Urban Artist Clip Of The Year at the Billboard Music Video Awards. Meanwhile, in July 1995 Aaliyah was nominated for Best R&B/Soul New Artist for "Back & Forth" at the Soul Train Lady of Soul Awards. British publication NME ranked the song at number 10 on their 50 "Incredible Debut Singles That Kick-Started Massive Careers" list.

HuffPost ranked the song at number 16 on their "Ranking Of The 33 Greatest Pop Divas’ Debut Singles list", stating "Aaliyah blended hip-hop and dance-pop to foster a sound that many of her peers would ape".
 Billboard included "Back & Forth" on their Summer Songs 1958-2016: The Top 10 Tunes of Each Summer list. The song was also ranked at number 13 on Idolator's The 50 Best Pop Singles Of 1994 list.
Rapper Kid Ink mentioned the song on his verse on Sevyn Streeter's 2014 song nEXt. 

In 2014 Beyoncé shared her memorial day playlist of songs via her website and "back and forth" was included on the list. In 2015 at pop singer Rihanna's 2nd annual diamond ball charity event the Dj included "Back & Forth" on the setlist. In November 2017 Reality star Kim Kardashian included the song on her Spotify "glam session" playlist. In 2018 Rapper Tyga sampled "Back & Forth" on his song "U Cry". In 2019 singer Chris Brown sampled "Back & Forth" on his song “Throw It Back" from his ninth studio album Indigo. In May 2020 Rolling Stone included the song at number 51 on their "The 100 Greatest Debut Singles of All Time" list. The song is ranked at number 476 on Billboards Greatest of All Time Songs of the Summer chart.

Charts

Weekly charts

Year-end charts

Certifications

|}

See also
List of number-one R&B singles of 1994 (U.S.)

References

Bibliography

External links
 

1994 debut singles
1993 songs
Aaliyah songs
Songs written by R. Kelly
Song recordings produced by R. Kelly
Jive Records singles
Blackground Records singles